Fotbal Club CFR 1907 Cluj (or CFR Cluj for short) is a Romanian professional football club based in Cluj-Napoca, Cluj County, Transylvania which was initially founded in 1907 as Kolozsvári Vasutas Sport Club (Railway Sport Club of Cluj originally in Hungarian) during the late period of Austria-Hungary. 

The first ever involvement of the club in an official UEFA European competition dates back to 2005, more specifically to that season's UEFA Intertoto Cup in which CFR Cluj (then officially known as CFR Ecomax Cluj) finished as runners-up, losing to French side RC Lens (one of the joint winners alongside Olympique de Marseille and Hamburger SV) 4–2 (aggregate) in the finale. 

Furthermore, thus far, throughout all the seasons played in the UEFA competitions, CFR Cluj established three solid records for the Romanian clubs which have participated along the passing of time in these continental competitions.

Records established in UEFA competitions amongst Romanian football clubs 

Therefore, in the 2012–13 UEFA Champions League season, CFR accumulated 10 points in a Champions League group, with the previous record being held by Unirea Urziceni with 8 points during the 2009–10 season. Moreover, subsequently, in the 2019–20 UEFA Europa League season, CFR accumulated as many as 12 points in the group stage, with the previous record being held by FCSB with 11 points during the 2012–13 season. In addition, the club also managed to qualify for the KPOs of the ongoing edition of the UEFA Europa Conference League, after gaining 10 points in Group G.

Recent history (2021–present) 

During the 2021–22 season, CFR Cluj was also the first Romanian football club qualified in the group stage of UEFA Europa Conference League during the first season of the competition's existence, in which they debuted with an away 1–0 loss at Jablonec nad Nisou in the Czech Republic against Czech side FK Jablonec on 16 September 2021 and consequently on the fourth place in the group after the first fixture. The club finished fourth in Group D of the first edition of UEFA Europa Conference League, with only 1 victory, 1 draw, and 4 losses, totalling 4 points.

During the 2022–23 season, CFR Cluj was eliminated from the first qualifying round of the ongoing UEFA Champions League edition by Armenian side Pyunik. This negative performance re-directed them towards the qualifying stages of the current UEFA Europa Conference League season which they had all successfully passed in the meantime, thereby entering the group stage of this UEFA competition consecutively for the second time. The club started their second UEFA Europa Conference League season rather modestly, with only a last minute 1–1 draw against Kosovar side FC Ballkani.

Subsequently, they lost 1–0 to Sivasspor at home and 3–0 away, mainly due to bad luck and referee mistakes, but they surprisingly went on to win over the group's top favourite Slavia Prague both home and away (3–0 overall). At the end of the 6 fixtures of the group stage, CFR managed to finish second with 10 points and thereby qualify for the knockout round play-offs in February 2023 when they are about to face Italian side Lazio Rome which finished third in their group (i.e. Group F) in the current edition of UEFA Europa League.

Total statistics 

.

Statistics by country

UEFA club ranking 

In the table below, the current UEFA club ranking position for CFR Cluj is shown based on its current UEFA coefficient for the ongoing 2022–2023 season.

Statistics by competition 

Notes for the abbreviations in the table below:

 1R: First round
 2R: Second round
 3R: Third round
 SF: Semi-finals
 F: Final
 1QR: First qualifying round
 2QR: Second qualifying round
 3QR: Third qualifying round
 PO: Play-off round
 R32: Round of 32
 KPO: Knockout round play-offs

Notes

References

External links 

  

CFR Cluj
Romanian football clubs in international competitions